Brent Ryan Green (born March 19, 1984) is an American film director and producer.

Career
Green has produced several films, the first of which was Beyond the Gates of Splendor (2002). In January 2009, Green founded Toy Gun Films with Jeff Goldberg and in 2011, had his directorial debut with the 2011 short film Paper Flower. He followed this film up with two additional shorts, Half Good Killer and Running Deer, the latter of which starred Booboo Stewart. Running Deer was filmed in Oklahoma and screened at the DeadCENTER Film Festival and won the Special Jury Prize for short film.

His feature film directorial debut, The Veil, was released two years later in 2013. Filming for The Veil took place in Oklaholma, a location that Green chose specifically while developing the project.

Filmography

References

External links
 
 Production company website
 

1984 births
Living people
Film directors from Oklahoma
Film producers from Oklahoma
Artists from Oklahoma City